Admiral Sir Eric James Patrick Brind,  (12 May 1892 – 4 October 1963) was a senior officer in the Royal Navy who served as the first Commander-in-Chief Allied Forces Northern Europe from 1951 to 1953.

Naval career

Brind also served in the Second World War as Chief of Staff to the Commander-in-Chief, Home Fleet from 1940 to 1942 when he became Assistant Chief of the Naval Staff. He was made commander of cruisers in the British Pacific Fleet in 1945.

Brind became President of the Royal Naval College, Greenwich, in 1946 and then Commander-in-Chief of the Far East Fleet in 1949. It was under Brind's command that one of his ships,  sailed up the Yangtze River and was stranded there for six weeks. He was made Commander-in-Chief, Allied Forces Northern Europe in 1951; he retired in 1953.

Honours and awards
11 June 1946 – Vice Admiral Eric James Patrick Brind CB CBE is appointed a Knight Commander of the Order of the Bath (KCB) for distinguished services during the war in the Far East.
 3 December 1946 – Vice Admiral Sir Eric James Patrick Brind KCB CBE is awarded Legion of Merit, officer degree for services whilst in command of units of the British Pacific Fleet attached to the United States Pacific Fleet during operations against the enemy from 15 to 14 March 1945.
1 January 1951 – Admiral Sir Eric James Patrick Brind KCB CBE is promoted to Knight Grand Cross of the Order of the British Empire.

References

External links
Royal Navy (RN) Officers 1939–1945

|-

|-

1892 births
1963 deaths
Admiral presidents of the Royal Naval College, Greenwich
Knights Commander of the Order of the Bath
Knights Grand Cross of the Order of the British Empire
Officers of the Legion of Merit
Royal Navy admirals of World War II
Royal Navy personnel of World War I
People from Paignton
Military personnel from Devon